Plains Indian Sign Language (PISL), also known as Hand Talk, Plains Sign Talk, and First Nation Sign Language, is a trade language, formerly trade pidgin, that was once the lingua franca across what is now central Canada, the central and western United States and northern Mexico, used among the various Plains Nations. It was also used for story-telling, oratory, various ceremonies, and by deaf people for ordinary daily use. It is thought by some to be a manually coded language or languages; however, there is not substantive evidence establishing a connection between any spoken language and Plains Sign Talk.

The name 'Plains Sign Talk' is preferred in Canada, with 'Indian' being considered pejorative by many who are Indigenous. Hence, publications and reports on the language vary in naming conventions according to origin.

As a result of several factors, including the massive depopulation and the Americanization of Indigenous North Americans, the number of Plains Sign Talk speakers declined from European arrival onward. In 1885, it was estimated that there were over 110,000 "sign-talking Indians", including Blackfoot, Cheyenne, Sioux, Kiowa  and Arapaho. By the 1960s, there remained a "very small percentage of this number".  There are few Plains Sign Talk speakers in the 21st century.

Geography
Sign language use has been documented across speakers of at least 37 spoken languages in twelve families, spread across an area of over 2.6 million square kilometres (1 million square miles). In recent history, it was highly developed among the Crow, Cheyenne, Arapaho and Kiowa, among others, and remains strong among the Crow, Cheyenne and Arapaho.

Signing may have started in the south, perhaps in northern Mexico or Texas, and only spread into the plains in recent times, though this suspicion may be an artifact of European observation. Plains Sign Talk spread to the Sauk, Fox, Potawatomi, Cherokee, Chickasaw, Choctaw, and Caddo after their removal to Oklahoma. Via the Crow, it replaced the divergent Plateau Sign Language among the eastern nations that used it, the Coeur d'Alene, Sanpoil, Okanagan, Thompson, Lakes, Shuswap, and Coleville in British Columbia, with western nations shifting instead to Chinook Jargon.

The various nations with attested use, divided by language family, are:
Piman: Pima, Papago, and continuing into northern Mexico
isolates of the Texas coast: Coahuilteco, Tonkawa, Karankawa, Atakapa
Yuman: Maricopa
Numic: Paiute, Ute, Comanche, Shoshone
Tanoan: Kiowa, Taos
Zuni Pueblo
Caddoan: Wichita, Pawnee, Arikara
Athabaskan: Apache (Mescalero, Lipan, Jicarilla, and Kiowa Apache), Navajo, Sarcee, Beaver
Algonquian: Blackfoot, Gros Ventre, Cheyenne, Arapaho, Cree, Ojibwa
Kutenai
Siouan: Mandan, Crow, Hidatsa, Omaha, Osage, Assinibion, Ponca, Oto, Sioux (Teton, Yankton, Yanktonai, Santee)
Sahaptian: Nez Perce, Sahaptin, Umatilla, Palus
Cayuse
Salish: Kalispel, Coeur d'Alene, Flathead, Spokane, Sanpoil (shifted from the distinct Plateau Sign Language)
A distinct form is also reported from the Wyandot of Ohio.

It is known that Navajo has a comparably sizeable population of individuals who can speak the Navajo dialect of Plains Sign Talk. There is also an unrelated sign language, Navajo Family Sign, in a clan of Navajos that has several deaf members.

There exists a variety of Plains Sign Talk within the Blackfoot Confederacy. Little is known about the language beyond that it is used by Deaf community members, as well as by the community at large, to pass on "oral" traditions and stories.

Phonology
There are four basic parameters of Plains Sign Talk: the location of the hand, its movement, shape, and orientation:

Location—this involves the spatial placement of a sign. Signs may change meaning when placed in a different location, for example, in front of the face as opposed to in front of the torso.
Movement—this involves, as implied, the way the hands move when forming the sign. For example, in Plains Sign Talk, the signs AFTERNOON and MID-DAY form minimal pairs as they are both formed exactly the same, the only difference being that MID-DAY is stationary and AFTERNOON moves from above the head to the side in an arching motion.
Handshape—as implied, each sign takes on a certain shape in the hand, called a handshape. The handshapes of signs are a very key parameter. For example, the signs YES and I-KNOW are the same in all parameters except for the handshape; in YES the hand makes the Plains Sign Talk J shape, and in I-KNOW the hand takes the L shape.
Orientation—this refers to the orientation of the palm. This is clearly seen in the Plains Sign Talk words ABOVE and ADD. Both involve having the left hand act as a base from which the right hand rises, and both have the same location, movement,  and handshapes; however, in ABOVE, the non-dominant hand is palm down, and in ADD the non-dominant hand is palm up.

There may be other parameters, such as facial features. However, these function like suprasegmentals, and the four parameters listed above are the crucial ones.

Although the parameters of sign are listed separately below, in actuality they co-occur with the other parameters to make a single sign. It is not clear how many of the differences were distinctive (phonemic).

Handshape
In 1880, Colonel Garrick Mallery published a glossary that illustrates the handshapes involved in the first Annual report of the Bureau of Ethnology. He assigned alphabetic letters to the handshapes, "for reference [...] to avoid tedious description, should any of them exactly correspond," as part of a suggested system of describing and cataloguing signs.

Fist, thumb in front of fingers (A or B)
Fist, thumb at side of fingers (C)
Fingers clenched, thumb touching middle of index finger (D)
Fingers hooked, thumb touching back tip of index finger (E)
Fingers hooked, thumb at side of fingers (F)
Fingers hooked, thumb touching tips of fingers (G)
Fingers slightly bent, thumb at side tip of index finger (H)
Fist, except index finger forming hook with thumb holding tip of index finger (I)
Fist, except index finger fully extended (J, K, or M)
Fist, except index finger and thumb extended, thumb bends at last joint to form 90 degree angle with index finger (L)
Fist except index and middle fingers fully extended (N)
Thumb, index, and middle finger pointing upward and separated, ring finger and pinky curved horizontally (O)
All fingers and thumb pointing upward and separated, palm cupped (P and Q)
All fingers and thumb fully extended and separated (R)
All fingers and thumb fully extended and held together (S and T)
Fingers gathered to a point, palm cupped, with thumb in the middle (U)
Fingers slightly bent, thumb at side of index finger (V)
All fingers and thumb extended, relaxed (Y)

Location
Plains Sign Talk uses the following locations. The various neutral spaces are the most common places for signs to occur.

Left side of torso
Right side of torso
Neutral space (centered in front of torso)
Upper neutral space
Lower neutral space
Left neutral space
Right neutral space
Mouth
Nose
Chin front
Below chin
Cheek
Eye
Below nose (above mouth)
Forehead
Head top (attached to top of head)
Head side (attached to head above ear)
Head back (attached to back of head)
Side of head right (space to the right side of head)
Side of head left (space to the left side of head)
Side of head front right (space in front of head on the right)
Side of head front left (space in front of head on the left)
Above head
Ear (attached to head at ear)
Beside ear (space beside ear)
Wrist
Palm front
Palm back
Left side of hand
Right side of hand
Below hand
Above hand
Fingers
Before face (space in front of face)
Chest
Chest right
Chest left
Elbow
Forearm
Shoulder
Feet

Orientation
These are the directions towards which the palm can face.

Up
Down
Non-dominant side
Dominant side
Toward signer
Away from signer

Movement
The movements below are found in Plains Sign Talk. They may be repeated in certain situations.

History 
Plains Sign Talk's antecedents, if any, are unknown, due to lack of written records. But, the earliest records of contact between Europeans and Indigenous peoples of the Gulf Coast region in what is now Texas and northern Mexico note a fully formed sign language already in use by the time of the Europeans' arrival there. These records include the accounts of Cabeza de Vaca in 1527 and Coronado in 1541.

William Philo Clark, who served in the United States Army on the northern plains during the Indian Wars, was the author of The Indian Sign Language, first published in 1885. The Indian Sign Language with Brief Explanatory Notes of the Gestures Taught Deaf-Mutes in Our Institutions and a Description of Some of the Peculiar Laws, Customs, Myths, Superstitions, Ways of Living, Codes of Peace and War Signs is a comprehensive lexicon of signs, with accompanying insights into indigenous cultures and histories. It remains in print.

Writing 

As Plains Indian Sign Language was widely understood among different tribes, a written, graphic transcription of these signs is known to have functioned as a medium of communication between Native Americans on and off reservations during the period of American colonization, removal, and forced schooling in the late 19th and early 20th centuries. The letter of a Kiowa student, Belo Cozad, in 1890 sent to Carlisle Indian School in Pennsylvania from his parents on a reservation in Oklahoma made use of such signs and becomes one of the few known indigenous written transcriptions of the Kiowa language.

See also
Plateau Sign Language

References

 Bergmann, Anouschka; Kathleen Currie Hall; Sharon Miriam Ross. "Language Files". USA. Ohio State University, 2007.
 Bureau of American ethnology. "Annual report of the Bureau of American ethnology to the Secretary of the Smithsonian institution". Washington, DC. Government printing office, 1881.
 Cody, Iron Eyes. "Indian Talk". CA. Naturegraph Publishers, Inc, 1970.
 Davis, Jeffrey E. "Hand Talk". USA. Cambridge University Press, 2010.
 Tomkins, William. "Indian Sign Language". Toronto, Ontario. Dover Publications, Inc, 1969

Further reading
 Newell, Leonard E. (1981). A stratificational description of Plains Indian Sign Language. Forum Linguisticum 5: 189–212.
 "Sign Language Among North American Indians Compared With That Among Other Peoples And Deaf-Mutes," First Annual Report of the Bureau of Ethnology to the Secretary of the Smithsonian Institution, 1879-1880, Government Printing Office, Washington, 1881, pages 263-552
 Clark, William Philo. 1885. The Indian Sign Language

Non-deaf sign languages
North America Native-based pidgins and creoles
Interlinguistics
Sign languages of the United States
Articles containing video clips
Sign languages of Canada
Languages of Mexico
Indigenous languages of New Mexico
Indigenous languages of California